Nobody Lives Forever is a 1946 American crime film noir directed by Jean Negulesco and based on the novel I Wasn't Born Yesterday by W. R. Burnett. It stars John Garfield and Geraldine Fitzgerald and features Walter Brennan, Faye Emerson, George Coulouris and George Tobias.

Plot
Former conman Nick Blake (John Garfield), a soldier returning to New York City after World War II, looks up his old girlfriend Toni Blackburn (Faye Emerson) to get the money she has been holding for him while he was in the army.  Toni claims that she lost the money investing in a nightclub before selling it to Chet King (Robert Shayne), who employs her there now as a singer. However, Nick has discovered Toni's affair with King, and gets his money back from King.

Nick looks up old conman Pop Gruber (Walter Brennan), who feels he's getting too old for the con game and that if he keeps it up, he will end up "selling pencils on the side of the road".  Nick and his crony Al (George Tobias) travel to Los Angeles, where another con artist, Doc Ganson (George Coulouris), has spotted a sucker, but has neither the money nor the charm necessary for the job. Doc reluctantly approaches Pop to recruit Nick, even though there is bad blood between them.

The plan is to have Nick, a ladies' man, romance rich recent widow Gladys Halvorsen (Geraldine Fitzgerald) and persuade her to invest in a phony tugboat business.  Nick agrees on the condition that he get two-thirds of the proceeds, increasing Doc's bitter resentment of the younger, more successful man.

The plan hits a snag when Nick falls in love with the intended victim and decides to back out of the con. At the same time, Gladys' business manager, Charles Manning (Richard Gaines), has found out about Nick's criminal past and alerts both Gladys and the authorities. The law can't touch Nick since he hasn't yet taken any money. Nick admits the truth to Gladys anyway. However, she is hopelessly in love and refuses to let him go.

Nick decides to pay the others the $30,000 he promised them, using his own money. Toni shows up, though, and learns of the aborted scheme. When she tells Doc that she is sure Nick intends to marry Gladys and her $2,000,000, the gang kidnaps the widow for a larger share of her money. Pop is able to follow them to their hideout. In the ensuing gunfight, Nick rescues Gladys, but both Doc and Pop are killed.

Cast 
 John Garfield as Nick Blake
 Geraldine Fitzgerald as Gladys Halvorsen
 Walter Brennan as Pop Gruber
 Faye Emerson as Toni Blackburn
 George Coulouris as Doc Ganson
 George Tobias as Al Doyle, Nick's friend
 Robert Shayne as Chet King
 Richard Gaines as Charles Manning
 Richard Erdman as Bellboy
 James Flavin as Shake Thomas, one of Doc's men
 Ralph Peters as Windy Mather, Doc's other associate
 Grady Sutton as Horace, the Counterman at Joe's Diner (uncredited)

Production
Nobody Lives Forever originated when Warner Bros. commissioned W. R. Burnett to write an original story for a film intended to star Humphrey Bogart, but Burnett's contracts carried a clause giving a time limit for the film to be made; after that time, the rights reverted to Burnett.  This occurred with Nobody Lives Forever, and Burnett then sold the story to Collier's Magazine in 1943 for serialization, and then to Alfred A. Knopf in 1945 for publication in book form. Warners then purchased the rights once more, and also paid Burnett to write the screenplay for the film.  By that time, Bogart was not available, as he was tied up making The Big Sleep, and was replaced with John Garfield, hot off of The Postman Always Rings Twice.

When the film was initially conceived, Ann Sheridan was to co-star with Bogart.

Critical response
New York Times film critic Bosley Crowther, while writing that the production team "managed a craftsmanlike job", nonetheless said that viewers will find the film's "repetition just a bit wearisome and even dull. They are likely to find the dialogue — although flavored with such racy words as 'pitch' and 'plant' and 'sucker' — rather heavily loaded with cliches. And they will certainly find nothing original in the easy solution of the plot."

Adaptation
The film was adapted for radio on the Lux Radio Theatre. The production featured Jane Wyman and Ronald Reagan and was aired on November 17, 1947.

References

External links
 
 
 
 
 Nobody Lives Forever information site and DVD review at DVD Beaver (includes images)
 

Streaming audio
 Nobody Lives Forever on Lux Radio Theatre: November 17, 1947

1946 films
1946 crime films
American black-and-white films
American crime films
Film noir
Films scored by Adolph Deutsch
Films about con artists
Films based on American novels
Films based on works by W. R. Burnett
Films directed by Jean Negulesco
Films set in Los Angeles
Films set in New York City
Warner Bros. films
1940s American films